The Men's Boxing Tournament at the 1963 Pan American Games was held in São Paulo, Brazil, from April 20 to May 5.

Medal winners

Medal table

External links
Amateur Boxing

Boxing
Pan American Games
1963